The steroid hormones are referred to by various abbreviations in the biological literature.  The purpose of this list is to give commonly used abbreviations for steroid hormones, with supporting references to the literature.

Table of abbreviations

References

Steroids
Steroid abbreviations